Jorma Korpela (born 22 December 1960) is a Finnish modern pentathlete. He competed at the 1984 Summer Olympics.

References

External links
 

1960 births
Living people
People from Savonlinna
Finnish male modern pentathletes
Olympic modern pentathletes of Finland
Modern pentathletes at the 1984 Summer Olympics
Sportspeople from South Savo